Mike Laird (born July 1, 1974, Portsmouth, Virginia) is an American professional BMX rider. He won the PlayStation Trick of the Year Award during the first ever AST Dew Tour. Laird was nominated pulling a double-tailwhip 360 in BMX Park Finals at Denver's Right Guard Open. Character in Dave Mirra's bmx video game series. Owner/ Fabricator of lairdframe. Lairdframe is a custom geometry bicycle frame company, specializing in chromoly and titanium.

Media Appearances
 Dave Mirra Freestyle BMX (video game) (PlayStation (console))
 Dave Mirra Freestyle BMX 2 (PlayStation 2 and Xbox (console))
 Dave Mirra Freestyle BMX 3 (Game Boy Advance)

Sponsors
 Eastern Bikes
Useless Clothes
Nirve Bikes
Vans Shoes
Huffy Bikes
 Fox Racing

References

BMX riders
1974 births
Living people